The 2019–20 PSA Women's World Squash Championship was the 2019–20 women's edition of the World Squash Championships, which serves as the individual world championship for squash players. The event took place in Cairo, Egypt from 24 October to 1 November 2019.

Seeds

  Raneem El Weleily (final)
  Nour El Sherbini (champion)
  Camille Serme (quarterfinals)
  Nouran Gohar (semifinals)
  Nour El Tayeb (quarterfinals)
  Joelle King (quarterfinals)
  Sarah-Jane Perry (quarterfinals)
  Amanda Sobhy (first round)
  Tesni Evans (third round)
  Annie Au (third round)
  Alison Waters (third round)
  Joshna Chinappa (third round)
  Salma Hany (third round)
  Hania El Hammamy (semifinals)
  Yathreb Adel (third round)
  Joey Chan (first round)

  Nele Gilis (second round)
  Olivia Blatchford (second round)
  Zeina Mickawy (second round)
  Emily Whitlock (first round)
  Millie Tomlinson (second round)
  Nadine Shahin (second round)
  Mariam Metwally (first round)
  Rachael Grinham (second round)
  Rowan Reda Araby (second round)
  Tinne Gilis (third round)
  Donna Lobban (second round)
  Hollie Naughton (second round)
  Julianne Courtice (second round)
  Milou van der Heijden (second round)
  Coline Aumard (second round)
  Nada Abbas (second round)

Draw and results

Finals

Top half

Section 1

Section 2

Bottom half

Section 3

Section 4

See also
 World Squash Championships
 2019–20 PSA Men's World Squash Championship

References

World Squash Championships
Women's World Squash Championship
Squash tournaments in Egypt
International sports competitions hosted by Egypt
Squash
PSA Women's World Squash Championship
PSA Women's World Squash Championship